Mount Satopanth (7084m) is one of the prominent peaks of the Garhwal range of Himalayas that fall in the Indian subcontinent and also the second highest peak in Gangotri National Park.

Location 
Satopanth is a mountain in the Gangotri region of the Garhwal Himalaya, in the Indian Himalayas. It lies in the northern Indian state of Uttarakhand. The nomenclature of the peak is derived by an amalgamation of two Sanskrit words “Sato” meaning ‘Truth’ and “Panth” meaning “A Figure of veneration or Devotion” when combined means "The True Figure of Devotion and Veneration".

Climbing history 
The mountain was first climbed successfully by a Swiss expedition in 1947, 15 days prior to the Indian independence, the team was led by André Roch. Lately the mountain has become quite famous for its pre-Everest expeditions, because of her majestic altitude, the daunting ‘knife ridge’ at 6500m and the technical ice and rock glacial negotiations at 5900 m.

Colin Kirkus climbed Satopant'h with Charles Warren in 1933 while a member of Marco Pallis's expedition; his account of the climb is included in Pallis's book Peaks and Lamas.

References

Mountains of Uttarakhand
Seven-thousanders of the Himalayas